The 2021–22 Southland Conference women's basketball season is scheduled to begin with practices in October 2021 followed by the 2021–22 NCAA Division I women's basketball season in November 2021. The conference is scheduled to begin in December 2021. This was the 35th season under the Southland Conference name. 

The Southland Conference tournament is scheduled for March 9–13, 2022 at the Merrell Center in Katy, Texas.

Pre-season

Preseason polls

Southland Conference Coaches' Poll

Source:

SWAC Preseason All-Conference

Preseason All-Southland First Team

Source:

Preseason All-Southland Second Team

Source:

Midseason watchlists
Below is a table of notable midseason watch lists.

Final watchlists
Below is a table of notable year end watch lists.

Regular season

Records against other conferences
2021–22 records against non-conference foes as of (January 9, 2022):

Regular Season

Post Season

Record against ranked non-conference opponents
This is a list of games against ranked opponents only (rankings from the AP Poll):

Team rankings are reflective of AP poll when the game was played, not current or final ranking

† denotes game was played on neutral site

Awards and honors

Players of the Week
Throughout the conference regular season, the Southland Conference offices named one or two players of the week each Monday.

Totals per School

References